Corniglia (locally ) is a frazione ("hamlet") within the comune of Vernazza in the province of La Spezia, Liguria, northern Italy with a population of about 150 (in 2016). Unlike the other localities of the Cinque Terre, Corniglia is not directly adjacent to the sea.  Instead, it is on the top of a promontory about 100 metres high, surrounded on three sides by vineyards and terraces, the fourth side descends steeply to the sea. To reach Corniglia, it is necessary to climb the Lardarina, a long brick flight of steps composed of 33 flights with 382 steps or, otherwise follow a vehicular road that, from the station, leads to the village. Sometimes a small bus runs.

The village stretches along the main road, Fieschi Road, and the houses have one side facing this road and the other facing the sea. Corniglia is characterised by narrow roads and a terrace in the rock from which all other four Cinque Terre's villages, two on one side and two on the other, can be seen. The town planning structure presents original characteristics compared to those of the other villages: the houses are lower set, and only more recently higher, similar to those of the villages of the hinterland.

Corniglia is mentioned in a famous novella of Giovanni Boccaccio's Decameron and in the novel The Invisible Circus by Jennifer Egan.

History 
The origin of the village dates back to the Roman Age as testified by the name, which finds its roots in Gens Cornelia, the Roman family to whom the land belonged. In the Middle Ages it was a possession of the counts of Lavagna, the lords of Carpena and of Luni. In 1254 Pope Innocent IV gave it to Nicolò Fieschi, who held it until 1276, when the village was acquired by the Republic of Genoa.

Main sights
Documents dating from 1276 to 1277 mention the existence of a castle. However, remains of the castle have yet to be discovered and the location of the castle grounds is unknown. The only ruins in Corniglia belong to Genoese fortifications, a stronghold on a cliff plunging into the sea, which dates back to approximately 1556.

Popular Culture 
The 2021 animated film Luca was inspired by the Cinque Terre towns. While the fictional Portorosso town in the film is set on a coast, the Pixar animation team was particular interested in Corniglia for its more remote and less tourist heavy nature.

Gallery

References

External links

 Corniglia @ Cinque Terre Tourist Association
 Cinque Terre Pics Cinque Terre Slideshow - 50 Pictures

Coastal towns in Liguria
Frazioni of the Province of La Spezia
Italian Riviera
World Heritage Sites in Italy